Frank Fellows was the head coach of the Maryland Terrapins men's basketball team from 1967 to 1969. He compiled a 16–34 record. He never made an appearance in the NCAA tournament.  He was a player for the Maryland Terrapins men's basketball from 1950 to 1953.

References

Year of birth missing (living people)
Living people
American men's basketball players
Basketball coaches from Wisconsin
Basketball players from Wisconsin
College men's basketball head coaches in the United States
Maryland Terrapins men's basketball coaches
Maryland Terrapins men's basketball players
People from Marinette County, Wisconsin 
People from Silver Spring, Maryland
Players of American football from Wisconsin